Raizman is a surname. Notable people with the surname include:

Maurice Raizman (1905–1974), French chess master
Yuli Raizman (1903–1994), Russian film director

See also
Raisman